Azerigasbank, sometimes spelled as Azerigazbank or AGBank is a private commercial bank established in 1992 in Baku, Azerbaijan. It is the member of Baku Stock Exchange since 15 September 1993. The official auditor of the bank is the international auditor PricewaterhouseCoopers from 2000 on.

Shareholders
International Finance Corporation  - 17.500 percent
Kazimir Partners Company - 10.000 percent
Chingiz Asadullayev (chairman of the supervisory board) - 27.532 percent 
Farzulla Yusifov (member of the supervisory board) - 23.111 percent

The minority shareholders count to 74 and hold 21.856 percent of the bank's equity. The bank's dividend policy is to pay out 15 percent dividends per annum.

Awards
In 2005 AGBank received "Caspian Energy Award" in nomination "Corporate bank of 2005".
In 2006 AGBank received national business award “UGUR” in nomination "Bank of the Year".
In 2008 AGBank received national business award “UGUR” in nomination "Rebranding of the Year".
In 2010 AGBank received “Azerbaijani Business Award” in nomination "Innovative Product of the Year".

See also

 Banking in Azerbaijan
 Central Bank of Azerbaijan
 List of banks in Azerbaijan
 Azerbaijani manat
 Economy of Azerbaijan

References

External links
AGBank web site

Government of Azerbaijan
Economy of Azerbaijan
Banks of Azerbaijan
Banks established in 1992